The Talas Ala-Too or Alataw range is range of the Tian Shan mountains forming the southern and eastern border of Talas Region of Kyrgyzstan. Its western end extends into Kazakhstan, and its south-western end joins the Pskem Mountains and Ugam Range of Uzbekistan. Its eastern end joins the Kirgiz Alatau mountains. To the north is the Talas River valley, and, to the south, Jalal-Abad Region. The highest point is Mount Manas (4484m) near the Uzbek border. There are four major passes along the range. Ötmök pass (closed in winter) is the road entrance from the east. The main road from Bishkek to Osh enters from the east over the Ala-Bel pass, passes through the Chychkan State Zoological Reserve and then turns south over another pass into Jalal-Abad province. The Kara-Buura pass (road) and Terek pass (no major road) lead south into Jalal-Abad provinces.

References
Laurence Mitchell, Kyrgyzstan, Bradt Travel Guides, 2008.

Mountain ranges of Kyrgyzstan
Mountain ranges of Kazakhstan
Mountain ranges of Uzbekistan
Mountain ranges of the Tian Shan